Patli Union Parishad is a union parishad under Jagannathpur Upazila of Sunamganj District in the division of Sylhet, Bangladesh. It has an area of 32.52 square kilometres and a population of 21,383.

Geography 
Patli Union shares borders with the Kolkolia Union in the west, Mirpur Union in the east, Bhatgaon, Chhatak in the north, and Jagannathpur Pourashava in the south. It has an area of 32.52 square kilometres.

History 
The union is named after the village of Patli in the Union. There was a time when its Rusulganj Bazar was nicknamed the soul centre (pran-kendro) of Sunamganj. Ayub Ali Master, a member of the Patli Union Parishad, renamed his village of Achol to Hason-Fatehpur in the late 20th century. Furthermore, Phir Shah Kalu decedent relocated from Biswanath and reside in the village of Patli which was than predominantly elite Hindu people residing in Patli village later migrated elsewhere selling their lands and homes to Muslim people whom settled in Patli.

Administration
The union parishad has 9 wards, 29 mouzas and 50 villages.
 Ward 1: Rameshwarpur, Lama Rasulganj Bazar, Bongaon, Noorbala, Lautola, Radhuni Kona, Rasulpur
 Ward 2: Hamidpur, Prabhakarpur
 Ward 3: Shashon, Islampur, Nondirgaon, Alipur, Shachayani
 Ward 4: Chanpur, Chokasimpur, Assampur, Parameshwarpur, Shonapur, Kabirpur
 Ward 5: East Faridpur, Minazpur, Sulemanpur, Ekabor, Shathaal
 Ward 6: Jongolgaon, Makrampur, Mogurjana, Patli, Hason-Fatehpur
 Ward 7: Chanpur Chok, Darikhunjanpur, Digharkul, Saizpur, Rasulganj Bazar
 Ward 8: Goalkuri, Kaminipur, Samat
 Ward 9: Lohargaon, Khetropasha, Srikorpur Bade, Muhammadpur Shera, Kuriyain, Dhonjoypur

Education
Patli Union Parishad has
 18 Govt. Primary school
 3 Middle schools
 1 Women College
 2 dakhil madrasas
 2 alim madrasas
 1 Qaumi Madrasa

HEALTH CENTRE

RDF MATERNITY CARE

Language and culture 
The native population converse in their native Sylheti dialect but can also converse in Standard Bengali. Languages such as Arabic and English are also taught in schools. The union has 44 masjids.

Notable people
 Abdur Raees of Bangaon (1931-1988), former Member of Parliament in Pakistan and Bangladesh
 Anwar Choudhury of Prabhakarpur (born 1959), former Governor of the Cayman Islands and High Commissioner of the UK to Bangladesh
 Ayub Ali Master of Achol/Hason-Fatehpur (1880-1980), social reformer in Britain
 Luthfur Rahman of Shathal (born 1976), deputy leader of Manchester, England
 Shah Abdul Majid Qureshi of Patli (1915-2003), social reformer in Britain

References

Patli Union